Manius Valerius Maximus Messalla was Roman consul in 263 BC.

Biography
Manius Valerius Maximus was the son of Marcus Valerius Maximus Corvinus, consul in 289 BC, and grandson of Marcus Valerius Corvus.  With his colleague, Manius Otacilius Crassus, he gained a brilliant victory over the Carthaginians and Syracusans: more than sixty of the Sicilian towns acknowledged the supremacy of Rome, and the consuls concluded a peace treaty with Hiero, which lasted the remainder of his long life. This acknowledgment proved equally advantageous to both Syracuse and Rome.  He alone was awarded the triumph De Paeneis et Rege Siculorum Hierone.

His relief of Messana obtained him the cognomen Messalla, which remained in the family for nearly 800 years. To commemorate his Sicilian victory, he arranged for it to be pictorially represented on the wall of the Curia Hostilia, the first example of an historical fresco at Rome. He is also said to have brought the first sundial from Catana to Rome, where it was set up on a column in the forum.

Messalla was censor in 252 BC, when he degraded 400 equites to aerarians for neglect of duty in Sicily.

References

Sources

3rd-century BC Roman consuls
Catania
Roman censors
Ancient Roman generals
Roman patricians
Roman triumphators
Manius